The 1961 Columbia Lions football team represented Columbia University in the 1961 NCAA University Division football season as a member of the Ivy League. The Lions were led by fifth-year head coach Aldo Donelli and played their home games at Baker Field. The Lions finished the season 6–3 overall and 6–1 in Ivy League play to win Columbia's first and only Ivy League championship, sharing the title with Harvard.

Although Columbia had accumulated an Ivy record of 4–10 in the previous two seasons, expectations for the team in 1961 were high; the Columbia Spectator wrote before the season, "[i]f practically no one gets hurt, if a few key sophomores come through, and most important of all, if [Aldo] Donelli's nineteen experienced seniors get fighting mad, then no Ivy League squad will have a chance against the Lions."

The Lions began the season on the road against Ivy League foe Brown, whom they defeated in one of the most lopsided victories in Columbia Lions history, but followed up with a homecoming defeat against Princeton; despite this, Princeton's head coach, Dick Colman, said, "I'll tell you this much–they had the better team." Although the team had led the Tigers 14–0, depth was and remained an issue throughout the season for the Lions; Columbia had only 14 players that consistently played and, as was common in the era, did not have separate offensive and defensive units. The team entered the penultimate week of the season having to defeat Penn to win a share of the conference title. Playing without their captain, Bill Campbell, who had been injured, the Lions defeated the Quakers 37–6. Five members of the team were awarded All-Ivy honors following the season: Bob Asack, Lee Black, Tony Day, Tom Haggerty, and Russ Warren. In 2006, the 1961 Columbia Lions football team became the fourth sports team to be inducted into the Columbia University Athletics Hall of Fame, in recognition of their championship season.

Schedule

References

Columbia
Columbia Lions football seasons
Ivy League football champion seasons
Columbia Lions football